The Green Party of Canada is a federal political party in Canada, founded in 1983 with a focus on green politics.  

The Green Party is currently the fifth largest party in the House of Commons by seat count. It elected its first member of Parliament (MP), leader Elizabeth May, in the 2011 election, winning in the Saanich—Gulf Islands. In the 2019 election, the party expanded its caucus to three. In the 2021 election, the party fell to two seats.

Elizabeth May has served as the party leader since 19 November 2022. She previously served as party leader from 2006 to 2019. The deputy leader is Jonathan Pedneault.

The Green Party is founded on six principles, including ecological wisdom, non-violence, social justice, sustainability, participatory democracy, and respect for diversity.

History

About two months before the 1980 federal election, eleven candidates, mostly from ridings in the Atlantic provinces, issued a joint press release declaring that they were running on a common platform. It called for a transition to a non-nuclear, conserver society. Although they ran as independents, they unofficially used the name "Small Party" as part of their declaration of unity, a reference to the "small is beautiful" philosophy of E. F. Schumacher. This was the most substantial early attempt to answer the call for an ecologically oriented Canadian political party. A key organizer (and one of the candidates) was Elizabeth May, who was the leader of the Greens from 2006 to 2019.

The Green Party of Canada was founded at a conference held at Carleton University in Ottawa in 1983. Under its first leader, Trevor Hancock, the party ran 60 candidates in the 1984 Canadian federal election.

The Quebec wing hosted the 1990 Canadian Greens conference in Montreal. But soon after that, Canada's constitutional problems interfered, and many Quebec candidates abandoned the Greens in favour of a Quebec sovereigntist party, the Bloc Québécois. There were only six Green candidates from Quebec in the 1993 election. In the spring of 1996, although the hopes of electing a representative to the BC legislature proved premature, Andy Shadrack in the interior of the province received over 11% of the vote. Overall, the party's proportion of the popular vote surged to a new high. Shadrack was also the most popular Green candidate in the 1997 federal election, scoring over 6% of the popular vote in West Kootenay—Okanagan.

Joan Russow years
British Columbia's Joan Russow became leader of the Green Party of Canada on 13 April 1997. Russow won 52% of the ballots cast in the 1997 leadership race, surpassing Ontario's Jim Harris (39%) and Rachelle Small (8%). Immediately upon attaining the leadership, Russow was plunged into a federal general election. Russow's campaign in 1997 set a number of important precedents. The 1997 federal election was the first campaign in which the Greens conducted a national leader's tour, presented a national platform and a bilingual campaign. Previous campaigns, due in part to the party's few resources and, in part, to the party's constitutional straitjacket, had been characterized by policy and spokespeople operating, at best, province-by-province and, at worst, riding-by-riding. In her own riding of Victoria, Russow received just shy of 3000 votes and 6% of the popular vote.

In 1998, the party adopted a rule that forbids membership in any other federal political party. This was intended to prevent the party from being taken over. A small number of Greens who advocate the more cooperative approach to legislation objected to the rule not to hold cross-memberships, a tool they occasionally employed.

Since its inception, the party has been developing as an organization, expanding its membership and improving its showing at the polls. In the 2000 federal election, the party fielded 111 candidates, up from 78 in 1997.

Candidates were not run in Newfoundland and Labrador, as a result of ongoing divisions over Joan Russow's refusal to endorse the Green candidate in an earlier St. John's West by-election. (The candidate in question supported the seal hunt and mining development, as most locals did.) This caused much uncertainty and friction between Newfoundland's Terra Nova Green Party Association and the Green Party leader as the party gradually adapted to the realities of functioning as a true national party rather than a disorganized federation of local activists.

The conflicts left Russow isolated and alienated from most members of the party. Volunteer efforts were substantially absorbed in provincial campaigns between 2001 and 2003, and the federal party became dormant between elections, as was typical in the past. Chris Bradshaw served the party as interim leader from 2001 to February 2003. During his term, the party ended its sharing of office and staff with the Ontario party, establishing its own office in the national capital of Ottawa.

Russow left the party in 2001 and later criticized the Green Party for not following their policies. She re-joined the party in 2020 to support Dimiti Lascaris' campaign for the Green Party leadership.

Breakthrough under Jim Harris

In February 2003, Jim Harris, in his second bid for the leadership, defeated John Grogan of Valemount, British Columbia, and Jason Crummey. Crummey was originally from Newfoundland and involved with Newfoundland and Labrador Terra Nova Greens.

During the 2004 federal election the Green Party of Canada became the fourth federal political party ever to run candidates in all the ridings. When the ballots were counted, the Green Party secured 4.3 percent of the popular vote, thereby surpassing the 2 percent threshold required for party financing under new Elections Canada rules.

Momentum continued to build around the Green Party of Canada and in the 2006 federal election the Green Party again ran 308 candidates and increased its share of the popular vote to 4.5 percent, once again securing federal financing as a result.

The party's 2006 election campaign was disrupted by allegations made by Matthew Pollesell, the party's former assistant national organizer, that Harris had not filed a proper accounting of money spent during his 2004 leadership campaign, as required by law. Pollesell issued a request that Elections Canada investigate. Pollesell and another former party member, Gretchen Schwarz, were subsequently warned by the party's legal counsel to retract allegations they had made or face a possible legal action. Dana Miller, who served in the party's shadow cabinet with responsibility for human-rights issues, made public her earlier complaints that the party has violated election law and its own constitution and has also asked for an Elections Canada investigation. Miller had been expelled from the party after filing a complaint within the party in April.

Some opponents of Harris's leadership of the Green Party formed the rival Peace and Ecology Party, which presumably disbanded after he stepped down as leader.

Arrival of Elizabeth May

A leadership vote was held at the party's August 2006 convention. On 24 April 2006, Jim Harris announced his intention not to stand for re-election as party leader. Three candidates officially entered the leadership race: David Chernushenko, Elizabeth May, and Jim Fannon. May won the leadership with 65% of the vote on the first ballot.

On 22 October 2006, Elizabeth May announced she would run in the federal by-election to be held on 27 November 2006, in London North Centre, Ontario. She finished second behind the Liberal candidate, but garnered 26% of the popular vote.

Even though they had never held a seat yet, Elizabeth May's Green Party began to receive more mainstream media attention on other party policy not directly related to the environment – for example, supporting labour rights and poppy legalization in Afghanistan.

On 30 August 2008, Vancouver area MP Blair Wilson became the first-ever Green member of Parliament, after sitting for nearly a year of the 39th Canadian Parliament as an independent. He had been a Liberal MP but stepped down voluntarily from the caucus earlier in the Parliament after anonymous allegations of campaign finance irregularities, most of which he was later cleared after a 9-month investigation by Elections Canada. Wilson had joined the Green Party during Parliament's summer recess and never sat in the House of Commons as a Green MP.

After initial opposition from three of the four major political parties, May was invited to the leaders' debates, a first for the party. In the 2008 federal election, the party increased its share of the popular vote by 2.33% (to 6.80%), being the only federally funded party to increase its total vote tally over 2006, attracting nearly 280,000 new votes. However, the party failed to elect a candidate. Some prominent Green Party members blamed the public discussion of strategic voting and the media's misrepresentation of May's comments during the election campaign for the failure of some promising candidates to reach Election Canada's 10% reimbursement threshold, as well as reducing the party's federal funding based on popular vote.

On 11 August 2010, 74% of Green Party members voted to hold a leadership review after the next election, instead of in August 2010, which was when May's four-year term as leader was set to end.

Greens in Parliament 
On 2 May 2011, May became the first elected Green Party MP to sit in the House of Commons. She won the riding of Saanich—Gulf Islands in coastal British Columbia. In winning her seat, May also became one of the few Greens worldwide to be elected in a federal, single-seat election. On 13 December 2013, Thunder Bay—Superior North MP Bruce Hyer, who had left the New Democratic Party (NDP) in 2012 to sit as an independent after breaking party lines to vote in favour of a repeal of the Long Gun Registry, joined the party, resulting in a record two-member caucus in Parliament.
In August 2014, party president-elect Paul Estrin published a blog post on the Green Party's website criticizing the actions of Hamas during the 2014 Israel–Gaza conflict. In his article, "Why Gaza Makes Me Sad", Estrin talked about Hamas' "desire to obliterate" the State of Israel and how the terrorist group uses children as human shields. Estrin's blog post was subsequently deleted by the party, with many party seniors and decision makers, including Elizabeth May, distancing themselves from Estrin, with a large majority of the party calling on him to resign. On 5 August, Estrin resigned, criticizing the party for betraying their commitment to values of inclusivity and open public discourse. Elizabeth May accepted the resignation of Estrin, stating that he was not forced to resign, but did so of his own volition. May has said that the problem with his statements were the "confusion" they caused because they differed from party lines, but confirmed that Estrin was indeed a "true Green".

In the lead up to the federal election on 19 October 2015, José Núñez-Melo joined the Green Party. Núñez-Melo, first elected in 2011 as a New Democrat in the riding of Laval, was barred by the NDP from seeking re-nomination after he publicly criticized the nomination process; after the dropping of the writ, Núñez-Melo announced he would run for re-election in Vimy as a Green Party candidate. As Parliament was dissolved for the election at the time of Núñez-Melo's change in affiliation, he was never formally recorded as a Green MP. Ultimately, May was re-elected in the riding of Saanich—Gulf Islands while both Hyer and Núñez-Melo were defeated, leaving May as the only member in the House.

In March 2018, Green Party leader Elizabeth May appointed journalist and broadcaster Jo-Ann Roberts as a deputy leader along with environmentalist Daniel Green of Montreal. Roberts ran as Green Party candidate in a Victoria, British Columbia, riding during the 2015 federal election and finished second.

On 6 May 2019, Paul Manly became the second MP elected under the party's banner, after winning a by-election in Nanaimo—Ladysmith. On 19 August 2019, a former NDP and briefly Independent MP Pierre Nantel joined the Green Party during the Parliament's summer recess.

During the 2019 federal election, both May and Manly were re-elected while Jenica Atwin was elected in her New Brunswick riding of Fredericton, making her the third elected Green MP in the federal parliament, and the first Green MP outside of British Columbia.

Division under Annamie Paul 

On 4 November 2019, May announced she would be stepping down as leader of the Green Party of Canada. May continued to act as parliamentary leader and sit as a Green member of Parliament. The decision to step down came as a promise to May's daughter. A leadership election was held on 3 October 2020, and Toronto-based lawyer and activist Annamie Paul was elected to succeed Elizabeth May as Green Party leader. At the time, Annamie Paul had been described as a centrist.

Paul ran in the 2020 Toronto Centre federal by-election, where she placed second.

On 10 June 2021, Jenica Atwin crossed the floor, leaving the Green caucus to join the Liberal caucus. This came shortly after a public rift over the Israeli–Palestinian conflict. Atwin had criticized party leader Paul's statement on the matter following Israeli airstrikes as "inadequate", which in turn prompted an advisor to Paul, Noah Zatzman, to vow to replace Atwin with a "Zionist" candidate. In a Facebook post, Zatzman stated: "We will work to defeat you and bring in progressive climate champions who are antifa and pro LGBT and pro indigenous sovereignty and Zionists!!!!!” Atwin cited "distractions" in the Green Party as a factor in her departure. The Green federal council subsequently passed a motion calling for Paul to repudiate Zatzman for his statements towards Atwin and other Green MPs, of which Paul refused to act on. Following Atwin's defection, the remaining two Green MPs, Elizabeth May and Paul Manly, reaffirmed their commitment to their party and expressed their disappointment, stating "the attack against Ms. Atwin by the Green party leader’s chief spokesperson on May 14 created the conditions that led to this crisis.”

During the 2021 federal election, Mike Morrice was elected in Kitchener Centre, becoming the first Green MP elected in Ontario, and second Green MP outside of British Columbia, as well the former leader May was re-elected. However, Manly was defeated in Nanaimo—Ladysmith, and the party's share of the vote fell to its lowest amount in 21 years. As well, the Green Party ran candidates in only 252 of the country's 338 ridings; limited resources and staff layoffs hampered any attempt at a co-ordinated countrywide campaign, which also lacked a national director during all five weeks of election campaigning. A week after the election, Paul announced her intention to resign as leader.

According to reporting by The Tyee, Paul confronted the federal council following her statement to intend to resign. She allegedly asked the council “How many of you think I resigned today?” and following her statement with "Well, I didn't. I just started the process of my resignation." Paul allegedly told Elizabeth May "not to talk to the media" regarding her exit, but May ignored her request and stated that Paul was "creating chaos". May, talking with The Tyee, stated that Paul was resistant to leave the building, and continued to control the party's communications. She cited an instance of an associate of Paul blocking Lorraine Rekmans, an Indigenous woman, from making a statement regarding the National Day for Truth and Reconciliation, and writing a statement instead. An internal report of the Green Party obtained by The Globe and Mail stated: “there is systemic racism at the governance level of the party, which needs to be, but is not being, addressed.” Former leader Jim Harris was critical of Paul's statements on her experiences of racism within the Green Party and dismissed the existence of issues of systemic racism within the party, stating: “When she doesn’t get her way, she calls racism. Now, racism, sexism, and violent metaphors like 'walking over shards of glass' and 'spitting up blood' get headlines, but what we have to judge a leader by is their performance." A member of the Greens' federal council: Louise Comeau, stepped down following the internal turmoil, citing “[the] stress and anxiety of those meetings affected [her] physical and mental health," with regards to negotiations surrounding Paul's departure. May theorized Paul wished to negotiate a severance package before her departure as Green leader.

On October 28, 2021, Green members received a leadership review ballot regarding Paul's continued status as leader. Several days later, Paul told a press conference she was surprised by the review, and that it was unnecessary since she had previously announced her intention to resign. Paul's protracted departure was due to continued legal conflict between Paul and the Green Party's leadership, with Paul negotiating compensation for legal fees incurred due to arbitration following a previous attempt to remove Paul as leader. Paul officially resigned on November 10, 2021, as voting in the review was ongoing. Her resignation took effect on November 14, 2021 upon its acceptance by the party's federal council.

Rebuilding
On November 24, Amita Kuttner was appointed interim leader. Appointed at the age of 30, Kuttner was the youngest person to lead a federal political party, as well as the first transgender person and person of East Asian heritage.

The party's constitution requires a leadership election to select a permanent leader to begin within six months of the appointment of an interim leader, and conclude within two years of their appointment. Kuttner has said they do not wish to be the permanent leader. In December 2021, Kuttner said they believed there should be a "longer period before launching a permanent leadership contest, and then a short leadership race."

In a press conference about a week after their appointment, Kuttner said they wanted to start the process of regrowth and to heal the party. The party had released a report indicating that it was threatened with insolvency, and was considering closing its office in Ottawa. The party had lost 499 monthly donors since July 2021, and 6,259 members in the same time. Kuttner acknowledged internal conflict over Annamie Paul's leadership had affected donations. The report also blamed negotiations concerning Annamie Paul's departure as leader of the party for significant legal costs. In a December 2021 media interview, Kuttner said that the party's financial position was getting "back on track" and was "turning around" pointing to fundraising including at the party's virtual general meeting about a week earlier.

On September 11, 2022, the president of the party, Lorraine Rekmans, announced her resignation. She was very critical of the party and the candidates in the ongoing leadership race, stating "The dream is dead." She was succeeded as party president by Ian Soutar.

Second leadership of Elizabeth May

On November 19, 2022, Elizabeth May was elected leader of the party once again, and promises to convert the current leadership model into a co-leadership model, with Jonathan Pedneault being her co-leader. May ran with Pedneault in the leadership race, and Pedneault currently serves as the deputy leader of the party.

Principles and policies

Political position
The Green Party officially rejects the traditional left–right political spectrum, describing it as "something of an anachronism". Instead, the Green Party believes that "voters in modern democracies [are] divided on lines … more to do with 'insiders' and 'outsiders.'" According to co-founder and former leader Trevor Hancock, "the perennial left vs. right squabbling about who gets to control and benefit from the ever-expanding pie is to completely miss the point; the pie cannot continue to expand, indeed it must contract … the struggle for social justice is deeply rooted in the fact that the limits to growth requires a radical global and societal ­redistribution of the Earth’s limited resources."

The ecumenical approach (expressing affinities with all Canadian political tendencies and making cases to voters on all parts of the left-right spectrum) has been advocated by those who believe their success can also be measured by the degree to which other parties adopt Green Party policies. By this measure of success, the adoption of a revenue-neutral carbon tax at the British Columbia government level, greenhouse gas emission reduction programs, and  the promotion of the Green (Tax) Shift by the federal Liberal Party under former leader Stéphane Dion, indicated that Green Party policies gained traction in Canada.

An emphasis on a green tax shift in the 2004 platform, which favoured partially reducing income and corporate taxes (while increasing taxes on polluters and energy consumers), created questions as to whether the Green Party was still on the left of the political spectrum, or was taking a more eco-capitalist approach by reducing progressive taxation in favour of regressive taxation. Green Party policy writers have challenged this interpretation by claiming that any unintended "regressive" tax consequences from the application of a Green Tax Shift would be intentionally offset by changes in individual tax rates and categories as well as an 'eco-tax" refund for those who pay no tax. In 2019, the Green Party under Elizabeth May ran on a campaign slogan of "Not Left. Not Right. Forward Together."

The party is noted as having a wide range of internal factions; the 2020 leadership election saw both self-described moderate and eco-socialist candidates. Writing in Maclean's, Anne Kingston described the party as an "ideological hybrid", combining left-leaning views on social issues and welfare with a right-leaning embrace of market solutions and tax shifting; in another article, Matt Gurney concurred with that description, but also said that "in practice" the Greens are "simply another centre-left party". Other political commentators, such as Andrew Coyne, Chantal Hébert and Heather Mallick, identify the party as being on the left. However, The Political Compass also places the Greens as being centre to centre-right on the political spectrum, describing the Green Party of Canada as being "considerably more conservative than their sister parties just about everywhere else" and "arguably the West’s most fiscally conservative Green Party".

Principles
The Green Party of Canada is founded on six key principles that were adopted at the 2002 convention of the Global Greens. These principles are:
 Ecological wisdom
 Non-violence
 Social justice
 Sustainability
 Participatory democracy
 Respect for diversity

Leadership

Party leaders
Source:

Party parliamentary leaders 
The position of parliamentary leader was created on 4 November 2019, when then-leader Elizabeth May announced that she was resigning as leader of the party, but would remain leader of the parliamentary caucus. The position ceased to exist after May re-assumed the party leadership in 2022.
 Elizabeth May (2019–2022)

Election results

Source: History of Federal elections since 1867

Provincial and territorial parties

Nine provinces and one territory have an active Green party. While these parties and the Green Party of Canada share values and often supporters, they operate as independent entities and do not have common membership.

Currently, fourteen Green legislators sit in provincial legislative assemblies, including eight in Prince Edward Island, two in British Columbia, three in New Brunswick, and one in Ontario. The Greens in Prince Edward Island are the first Green party to form the official opposition in any provincial assembly.

The only province without a Green party is Newfoundland and Labrador. An association called the Terra Nova Greens, created in 1996, was previously the Green Party of Canada's "official unit" for the province. TNG was never a registered party, but fielded independent candidates in three provincial general elections. They remained the federal party's "official unit" until 2007, but most supporters cut ties to the national party in 2006 (or earlier) over its opposition to the traditional Newfoundland seal hunt. As of 2021, there are ongoing efforts to establish a provincial green party in Newfoundland and Labrador.

Nunavut and the Northwest Territories have legislatures that use non-partisan consensus government. As such, there are no registered green parties (or any other parties) in these territories. However, one member of the Northwest Territories Legislative Assembly is known to be a member of the federal Green Party: Rylund Johnson of Yellowknife North.

See also

Green Party of Canada leadership elections

References

External links

 Federal Council Elections 2021 - Candidates
 
 Young Greens of Canada 
 
 Green Party of Canada at The Canadian Encyclopedia
Green Party of Canada - Canadian Political Parties and Political Interest Groups - Web Archive created by the University of Toronto Libraries

1983 establishments in Canada
 
Environmental organizations based in Ontario
Federal political parties in Canada
Canada
Political parties established in 1983